The Abyssinian thrush (Turdus abyssinicus) is a passerine bird in the family Turdidae. It is also known as the African mountain thrush, or northern olive thrush In 2010, the species was confirmed as separate from the olive thrush (Turdus olivaceus) due to genetic differences. Their ranges do not overlap. The southern and northern populations may be distinct species. The Abyssinian thrush is found in Eritrea and other parts of the Horn of Africa, as well as an area to the southeast extending from the African Great Lakes region to north eastern Zambia and Malawi.

Description

This variable forest thrush is generally darker than the African thrush and has an orange (not yellow) bill. It is also darker than the Kurrichane thrush and has no malar stripes. Generally the birds get darker at higher altitudes.

Distribution, habitat and habits
The Abyssinian thrush occurs in the highlands of eastern Africa from South Sudan south to northern Mozambique.

Its habitat includes forests woodlands, exotic plantations, parks and gardens.

This species is a typical member of the genus Turdus but its habits and biology have been little studied, as it was considered to be a subspecies of olive thrush.

Taxonomy
The Abyssinian thrush was considered to be part of the olive thrush but that species has now been split and is regarded as a superspecies, members of which include the Taita thrush, Karoo thrush, Usambara thrush and Somali thrush.

Under the split the following subspecies have been recognised as being within the Abyssinian thrush:

Turdus abyssinicus abyssinicus Gmelin, 1789: Highlands of Ethiopia, south eastern South Sudan, northern Uganda, Kenya and northern Tanzania.
Turdus abyssinicus deckeni Cabanis, 1868: Northern Tanzania from Longido and Ketumbeine to Mount Kilimanjaro
Turdus abyssinicus baraka (Sharpe, 1903): Mountains of eastern Democratic Republic of the Congo and the Ruwenzori Mountains of western Uganda.
Turdus abyssinicus bambusicola Neumann, 1908: Highlands of Burundi, Rwanda, south western Uganda, north western Tanzania and eastern Democratic Republic of the Congo
Turdus abyssinicus nyikae Reichenow, 1904: The Nguru and Uluguru Mountains in Tanzania, northern Malawi and north eastern Zambia.
Turdus abyssinicus oldeani W. L. Sclater & Moreau, 1935: Mountains of north central Tanzania.

References

Works cited

Abyssinian thrush
Abyssinian thrush
Birds of East Africa
Abyssinian thrush
Abyssinian thrush